The Johnnys are an Australian pub rock band from Sydney forming in 1982 and still active today that combines country and punk musical styles. Members are Graham Hood, Billy Pommer Jr and Slim Doherty and have included founder, Roddy Ray'da (aka Roddy Radalj) and Spencer P. Jones.

History
The Johnnys formed in 1982 in Sydney when bass guitarist Graham Hood tried out for the Hoodoo Gurus after quitting the Allniters. He met Hoodoo Gurus' guitarist Roddy Ray'da (aka Roddy Radalj) and they discussed an idea for a side project: playing pub rock in a country music style at a punk pace—which was labelled as cow punk. Ray'da left Hoodoo Gurus and, as a lead vocalist and guitarist with Hood and drummer Billy Pommer Jr, founded The Johnnys. The Johnnys performed its first concert at Palms disco on Oxford St, Taylors Square, Darlinghurst Sydney Australia in November 1982. New Zealand-born Spencer P. Jones joined on guitar and backing vocals. The four-piece released "I Think You're Cute" in October on Regular Records, Ray'da left the group in early 1984 and formed Love Rodeo. Jones took on lead vocals and the band signed with the Green Label to release "My Buzzsaw Baby (Really Cut Me Up)" and an extended play, The Johnnys in November 1984.

In 1985, the band had signed with Mushroom Records which released their single, "Injun Joe" in November. "(There's Gonna Be a) Showdown" followed in March 1986 and then "Bleeding Heart " in June. Their debut album Highlights of Dangerous Life appeared in August and was produced by Ross Wilson of Daddy Cool and contained the three singles. Two non-album singles followed in 1987. Wilson produced their second album, Grown Up Wrong, released in August 1988 which included two further singles, "Motorbikin" (July) and "Anything Could Happen" (November). Michael Armiger (ex-Paul Kelly Band) replaced Hood on bass guitar. The band broke up in 1989 with Jones continuing in his side-project Beasts of Bourbon.

According to rock music historian, Ian McFarlane, "Despite being one of the most popular bands on the pub-rock circuit, The Johnnys never crossed over into the premier league". They gigged sporadically before performing as a three-piece with guests for a Sydney benefit show for Spencer P Jones in JUne, 2016. They remain a trio and have toured New Zealand in 2018. They played most of the support spots on the 2019 Australian "Still Here" Tour by The Beasts (ex-Beasts of Bourbon).

Members
Graham Hood – bass guitar
Billy Pommer Jr. – drums
Roddy Ray'da – guitar, vocals
Spencer P. Jones – guitar, vocals (d. 2018)
Michael Armiger – bass guitar
Paul "Slim" Doherty – guitar

Discography

Studio albums

Live albums

Singles

References

General
  Note: Archived [on-line] copy has limited functionality.
Specific

Musical groups established in 1982
Musical groups disestablished in 1989
New South Wales musical groups
1982 establishments in Australia
1989 disestablishments in Australia